Vanessa Peters (born September 16, 1980) is an American singer and songwriter.

Biography
Peters grew up in Dallas, Texas. She studied English and Creative Writing at Texas A&M University and her original intent was to obtain an MFA in Creative Writing and pursue a career as a novelist. Upon graduation, she moved to Castiglion Fiorentino, Italy, for a year.  There she learned to play guitar and began writing songs. Peters started playing music professionally in 2003.

Career

2003–2010 
In 2003 Peters released her first album, Sparkler, and in 2004 did a cross-country solo tour.  The same year, she also recorded her first album with Ice Cream on Mondays and they released the album, Thin Thread, in January 2005.  The collaboration with Ice Cream on Mondays produced three albums and numerous tours across Europe and America in which Peters was usually accompanied by the band's lead guitarist, Manuel Schicchi.

Peters has also produced solo records over the years, most notably the acoustic EP Blackout.  One of the tracks, "Afford to Pretend", was featured on NPR's All Songs Considered Open Mic in 2006. Peters has also had the song "Love Story" featured on MTV's The Real World: New Orleans and the song "The Next Big Bang" featured on Keeping Up with the Kardashians.

Her last album recorded with Ice Cream on Mondays, Sweetheart, Keep Your Chin Up, was well received by critics on both sides of the Atlantic and debuted at #12 on The Euro Americana Chart.  Peters and the band played 100+ dates in 2009 in support of the album, including shows at The Green Note in London and Folk Club in Torino, Italy.  After a follow-up tour in early 2010 of 50 shows across Europe, Vanessa and the band parted ways.

2010–2021 
In 2011 Peters recorded and released The Christmas We Hoped For, a holiday album featuring classics and an original composition. The album finished on a number of top 10 holidays lists, including About.com Top 2011 Pop Holiday albums.

In 2012 Peters released The Burn The Truth The Lies, an album financed by a successful Kickstarter campaign. The album was recorded in Austin by Jim Vollentine (Spoon, Patty Griffin) and was produced by Rip Rowan (Old 97's, Deathray Davies).  The album featured performances by Grammy Award-winning producer and guitarist Joe Reyes, as well as Apples in Stereo drummer John Dufilho and The Polyphonic Spree's Jason Garner.

On October 31, 2014, Peters gave a talk entitled "Music in the age of free" at a TEDx Stuttgart event, where she illustrated the struggle that independent musicians face earning a living by making and selling music in the digital age.

In 2015 Peters released With The Sentimentals, an album recorded live in Denmark with The Sentimentals, a Scandinavian Americana band.

On March 1, 2016, Peters released The Burden of Unshakeable Proof, an album recorded by producer Rip Rowan at their home studio in Dallas. On May 10, 2016, it was the first of Peters' albums to be released on vinyl.

Peters's album Foxhole Prayers was released on CD and vinyl on October 5, 2018, to critical acclaim. It was produced by Rip Rowan and John Dufilho at Electrofonic in Dallas, TX. Tracks were recorded between November 2017 and June 2018.

Peters release a collection of cover songs called Mixtape in April 2020.  The songs were recorded over a four-year period and feature electric guitars by Dallas's Christopher Holt (Don Henley).

Peters's most recent album is Modern Age, recorded while on tour in the Netherlands and Germany in November 2019, and finished in Italy in March 2020.  The album was recorded entirely with Peters's European touring band "The Electrofonics" which consists of Federico Ciancabilla (electric guitar), Andrea Colicchia (bass), Matteo Patrone (keyboards), and Rip Rowan (drums).

Critical reception 
Peters's songs have been widely praised by reviewers and critics for their thoughtful lyrics. Jeremy Hallock, writing for The Dallas Morning News, described Peters as "A brilliant songwriter with a literary quality that makes her songs comparable to short stories, Vanessa Peters is Dallas' Aimee Mann."

Ice Cream on Mondays

Peters' discography with Ice Cream on Mondays 

Thin Thread (2005)
Little Films (2006)
Sweetheart, Keep Your Chin Up (2009)

Core band members
Vanessa Peters: guitar and vocals
Manuel Schicchi: lead guitar, harmony vocals, banjo, harmonica
Juri Deluca: bass guitar
Alberto "Gumo" Serafini: drums and percussion

Additional members of the touring formation
Gabriele Galimberti: bass guitar
Alex Akela: violin, mandolin, and bass guitar

Solo discography
Mirabilandia EP (2002)
Sparkler (2003)
Blackout EP (2006)
The Christmas We Hoped For (2011)
The Burn The Truth The Lies (2012)
With The Sentimentals (2015)
The Burden of Unshakeable Proof (2016)
Foxhole Prayers (2018)
Mixtape (2020)
Modern Age (2021)

Notes

External links
 Official Site

Living people
American women singer-songwriters
American rock singers
American folk singers
American rock guitarists
American folk guitarists
1980 births
American rock songwriters
Musicians from Dallas
Singer-songwriters from Texas
Guitarists from Texas
21st-century American women singers
21st-century American women guitarists
21st-century American guitarists
21st-century American singers